Panagiotis Kalombratsos (born 24 November 1934) is a Greek rower. He competed in the men's coxed four event at the 1960 Summer Olympics.

References

1934 births
Living people
Greek male rowers
Olympic rowers of Greece
Rowers at the 1960 Summer Olympics
Rowers from Thessaloniki